The 2018–19 season was 2nd season in the top Ukrainian football league for FC Lviv. Lviv competed in Premier League, Ukrainian Cup.

On completion of the 2017–18 Ukrainian Premier League season, Veres Rivne, who had moved their operations to Lviv during the season announced the merging with FC Lviv who competed in the 2017–18 Ukrainian Second League and retain their name. This is the first time of such "swap" that has occurred with a team from the Ukrainian Premier League. Its certification the club passed on 5 June 2018. Along with that the FFU certification committee is consulting with the UEFA in regards of the "clubs swap". On 6 June 2018 it was announced that it is too early speculate composition of the league for the next season as the UEFA will make its final decision by allowing or not participation of FC Lviv. It is possible that some of already relegated clubs might be given a second chance if UEFA will insist on impossibility of the Lviv-Veres team swap. On 12 June 2018 Ukrainian Premier League updated its website removing any mentioning of NK Veres Rivne ever competing in the league and its record being awarded to FC Lviv. More to the story, in interview to "Tribuna" a head of the FFU Attestation Committee Viktor Bezsmernyi explained that it was Veres that received certificate for the 2018-19 Ukrainian Premier League and then the club changed its name. At same time the old-new president of Veres Khakhlyov demonstrated the club's certificate for the 2018-19 Ukrainian Second League.

Players

Squad information

Transfers

In

 Players transferred from Veres Rivne as part of teams merger / swap.

Out

Pre-season and friendlies

Competitions

Overall

Premier League

League table

Results summary

Results by round

Matches

Ukrainian Cup

Statistics

Appearances and goals

|-
! colspan=16 style=background:#dcdcdc; text-align:center| Goalkeepers

|-
! colspan=16 style=background:#dcdcdc; text-align:center| Defenders

|-
! colspan=16 style=background:#dcdcdc; text-align:center| Midfielders 

|-
! colspan=16 style=background:#dcdcdc; text-align:center| Forwards

|-
! colspan=16 style=background:#dcdcdc; text-align:center| Players transferred out during the season

Last updated: 31 May 2019

Goalscorers

Last updated: 31 May 2019

Clean sheets

Last updated: 31 May 2019

Disciplinary record

Last updated: 31 May 2019

References

External links
 Official website

FC Lviv
Lviv